Finvoy is a hamlet and civil parish in County Antrim, Northern Ireland. It is situated in the historic barony of Kilconway. The hamlet had a population of 187 people (52 households) in the 2011 Census.

The name derives from the Irish: An Fhionnbhoith (the white hut, church or monastic cell).

Civil parish of Finvoy
The parish is bounded by County Londonderry and the civil parishes of Ballymoney, Killraghts, Killagan and Rasharkin

Townlands
It contains the following 33 townlands:

A
Artiforty or Shanaghy, Artiloman, Artnagross

B
Ballaghbeddy, Ballymacaldrack, Ballynagarvy, Ballytunn

C
Caldanagh, Carney Hill, Carrowreagh, Craigs

D
Desertderrin, Dirraw, Drumlee, Dunloy, Eden

G
Glebe, Glengad

K
Killins North, Killymaddy, Knockans

L
Lisheegan

M
Maddykeel Lower, Manola Wood, Moneycanon, Moore Lodge, Mullans

N
New Buildings or Maddydoo Lower

R
Rosnashane, Rushey Hill

S
Slievenaghy

T
Tate's Fort, Tullaghans

See also
List of civil parishes of County Antrim
List of towns and villages in Northern Ireland

References

 
Villages in County Antrim